Harold Lambert may refer to:
Harold Lambert (physician) (1926–2017), British medical doctor
Harold Lambert (footballer) (1922–2021), former Australian rules footballer
Harold E. Lambert (1893–1967), British linguist and anthropologist in Kenya

See also
Harry Lambert (1918–1995), Australian cricketer